Nikola Gluščević (born 11 June 2001) is a Montenegrin footballer. He plays for Serbian club Budućnost Dobanovci.

Career
In 2018, Gluščević signed for Spanish La Liga side Sevilla, where his father, Igor, played.

For the second half of 2019–20, he was sent on loan to OFK Titograd in Montenegro.

In 2020, he signed for Serbian top flight club Proleter Novi Sad.

References

External links
 

2001 births
Living people
Montenegrin footballers
Association football forwards
OFK Titograd players
FK Proleter Novi Sad players
FK Budućnost Dobanovci players
Montenegrin First League players
Serbian SuperLiga players
Montenegrin expatriate footballers
Expatriate footballers in Serbia
Montenegrin expatriate sportspeople in Serbia